Aurea Alexandrina, in pharmacy, was a kind of opiate or antidote, in great fame among ancient writers. It is called Aurea from the gold which enters its composition, and Alexandrina as having been first invented by a physician named Nicolaus Myresus Alexandrinus. It was reputed a good preservative against the colic and apoplexy

References

Opioids
Antidotes